Sidi Mansour Mosque is a Tunisian mosque in El Hajjamine quarter, attached to the Bab El Jazira suburb in the south of the Medina of Tunis.

Localization
The mosque can be found in Sidi Mansour Street, near Bab El Fellah, one of the gates of the medina.

Etymology
The mosque was named after the saint Sidi Mansour Abou Daliah, attached to the Idrisid dynasty that ruled Morocco between 789 and 985.
He was born in Fes and died in Gafsa in the 15th century.

History
According to Hayet El Mejri, the kouttab of the mosque existed in 1875.

References

Mosques in Tunis